Hakea cinerea, commonly known as ashy or grey hakea, is a shrub in the family Proteaceae  native to areas along the south coast in the Goldfields-Esperance region of Western Australia. It is a showy ornamental species bearing creamy-white flowers aging to orange with contrasting ash coloured grey-green leaves.

Description
The inflorescence consists of 40-56 large showy creamy-white and yellow flowers turning orange with age in clusters in the leaf axils from August to November. Leaves are yellow at the base with 3 prominent grey-green longitudinal veins, 1-3 above and 3-6 on the underside.

Taxonomy and naming
Hakea cinerea was first formally described by Robert Brown in 1810 and published in Transactions of the Linnean Society of London. The specific epithet (cinerea) is derived from the Latin word cinereus meaning "of ashes", "ash coloured" or "ashen", referring to the colour of the foliage.

Distribution and habitat
Hakea cinerea is found from Ravensthorpe to Esperance and Israelite Bay. Has also been recorded at Point Culver at the western end of the Great Australian Bight. This species grows in a well-drained sunny site, preferring low-lying deep sand in heath, gravelly soils or low scrubland. An ornamental species good for windbreak or wildlife habitat.

Conservation status
Hakea cinerea is presently classified "not threatened" by the Western Australian Government Department of Parks and Wildlife.

References

cinerea
Eudicots of Western Australia
Plants described in 1810
Taxa named by Robert Brown (botanist, born 1773)